Canuck is a slang term meaning Canadian.

Canuck may also refer to:

Canuck, Saskatchewan, a ghost town in Canada
Canuck, the name of a young orca born to Sissy; he lived in SeaWorld San Diego
Avro Canada CF-100 Canuck, a Canadian jet interceptor/fighter that served during the Cold War
Canuck letter, a forged letter published in 1972
Captain Canuck, a Canadian comic book superhero
Johnny Canuck, a Canadian cartoon hero and superhero
Vancouver Canucks (WHL), a former minor league professional ice hockey team in the Pacific Coast Hockey League and the Western Hockey League
Vancouver Canucks, a National Hockey League team based in Vancouver, British Columbia, Canada
Abbotsford Canucks, an American Hockey League team based in Abbotsford, British Columbia, Canada, AHL affiliate of the NHL team Vancouver Canucks
Canuck the Crow, a crow voted Metro Vancouver's unofficial ambassador